Anacaenini is a tribe in the subfamily Hydrophilinae of aquatic beetles, and it contains 256 species in 6 genera.

Genera
 Anacaena
 Crenitis
 Notohydrus
 Notionotus
 Paracymus
 Phelea

References

Hydrophilinae
Polyphaga tribes